The PCU Dolphins are the senior athletic teams that represent Philippine Christian University. They are currently playing at the National Athletic Association of Schools, Colleges and Universities (NAASCU), after spending a leave of absence from the National Collegiate Athletic Association (Philippines) basketball.

Their 2004 title was their only NCAA basketball title. The juniors team are the Baby Dolphins while the women's team are the Lady Dolphins.

After the revelation in early 2007 that several of PCU's junior basketball players entered the university using fraudulent papers, the league suspended the school for the 2007-08. With the agreement that their seniors team can play on the 2008-09 season, the school took a voluntary leave of absence from the league starting at the 2009-10 season, in which they should re-apply their membership if ever they intend to return.

Name
Originally, the PCU administration chose a killer whale, but they instead chose a mammal close to their heart, the dolphin. The Juniors (high school) team are the Baby Dolphins.

Basketball

History
The PCU Dolphins entered the NCAA in 1996 headed by Orly Torrente (Seniors) and Karl de Guia (Juniors). Then known as the PCU Saints then went to the latter known, PCU Dolphins. They were known for their exemplary defense and hunger for the ball, leading to their only NCAA championship in 2004. The Dolphins' only problem is that they cannot seem to keep a head coach.

Also, the Baby Dolphins lose their best players to other college teams. Great players have been coming out of the PCU Baby Dolphins squad, but the coaches cannot seem to convince them to stay in PCU. Good players have included Ronjay Buenafe (EAC Generals),  Rabeh Al-Hussaini (Ateneo Blue Eagles), James Mangahas (De La Salle Green Archers), Allan Mangahas (Mapua Cardinals), Jake Pascual (San Beda Red Lions) and Gabby Martinez.

PCU eligibility scandal
After allegations of identity switching circulated via text messaging, Philippine Christian University (PCU) was investigated by the Management Committee (MANCOM) for alleged eligibility infractions on several of its varsity teams. The MANCOM has completed its own investigation and are waiting for PCU's internal investigation and has hinted of suspending the Dolphins for Season 83 after PCU's representatives did not show up in the MANCOM meeting.

After the deliberation by the MANCOM, the NCAA, via a statement issued by NCAA and José Rizal University (JRU) President Vicente Fabella, suspended the Dolphins from all events after four players of the Baby Dolphins basketball team were found to have used falsified documents. The Baby Dolphins were ordered to return their second-place trophy from last season's tournament and all individual awards. The senior Dolphins' 2005-06 general championship trophy was retained, however.

Rivalries
 Letran Knights - Met twice in the Final 4 (PCU won both), once in the Finals (Letran won)
 San Beda Red Lions - Met once in the Finals (San Beda won and ended 28 years of Championship drought)

Players of note
Chess (2006)

Daniel Causo - Gold Medalist Board 1

John Perzeus S. Orozco - Gold Medalist  Board 2

Paul Louis Orozco - Gold Medalist Board 4

Juniors
Allan Mangahas - Mapua Cardinals, 2005 NCAA Juniors MVP
Ronjay Buenafe -EAC Generals, Meralco Bolts
Rabeh Al-Hussaini - Ateneo Blue Eagles, Meralco Bolts, 2009 UAAP MVP, 2010 UAAP Finals MVP
Niño Dayao- PCU Dolphins assistant coach, 2008
Jake Pascual - San Beda Red Lions, Star Hotshots, 2006 NCAA Juniors MVP, Sinag Pilipinas (2011 SEA Games team)
Wilson San Diego
Mario Ronaldo Quijado
Rafael Paul Doma
CJ Isidoro
Eugene Pohol
Peter Buenafe
Paul Buenafe
Manuel Jimenez
Nico Bagawisan
Lloyd Burgos
Gabriel Martinez
Jett Vidal - Perpetual Altas
 Jeffrey Rosales
John Paul Peter Palma
Vonn Ryan Ramiro - 2 Sports Discipline Basketball and Track and Field - Gold Medalist Discus Throw Juniors 1999, 2000 and 2001 Bronze Medal 2000 Shot Put Juniors

Withdrawal from the NCAA

Rumors have leaked that PCU will not be with the NCAA at the start of the 85th season. Reasons for this are as follows: (note: the ff. reasons are still rumors)
 PCU plans to go to the UAAP
 PCU plans to go to other leagues such as NCRAA, CUSA, etc.
 PCU wants to rebuild and come back with a stronger lineup at the start of the 86th season, a season in which it will host.

There were talks of a possible PCU Dolphins comeback just before the 87th season started. The basketball team was rumored to be spearheaded by coach Ato Tolentino, the coach that led the Dolphins to their first and only basketball championship back in 2004. The talks died because of financial issues within the PCU organization.

Other Sports
 Roel Licayan (3-time gold medalist NCAA Lawn Tennis-Juniors Division)

Championships won

Seniors
 Basketball - 1 (2004–2005), (3 straight Finals appearance in '04, '05, '06)
 Football - 3 (1998–1999, 1999–2000, 2000–2001)
 Track and Field - 1 (2005–2006)
 Swimming - 3 (1999–2000, 2000–2001, 2001–2002)
 Volleyball
(M) - 1 (2005, 2006)
(W) - 2 (2003–2004, 2004–2005)
 Table Tennis (W) - 1 (2004–2005)
 Beach Volleyball (W) - 1 (2004–2005)
 Total = 13 championships

Juniors
 Track and Field - 2 (2002–2003, 2004–2005)
 Table Tennis - 1 (2004–2005)
 Chess - 3 (2005–2006)
 Total = 6

References

Former National Collegiate Athletic Association (Philippines) teams
Former Philippine Basketball League teams
College sports teams in Metro Manila